The 2012 Conference USA baseball tournament was held at Trustmark Park in Pearl, MS from May 23 to May 27, 2012.  The tournament used the format from the previous season, with the top eight teams from the regular season divided into two four-team pods.  After round robin play, the teams with the best record in each pod will met in a championship game.   won their first championship and claimed the Conference USA's automatic bid to the 2012 NCAA Division I baseball tournament.

Seeding
The top eight teams (based on conference results) from the conference earned invites to the tournament.

Results

All-Tournament Team
The following players were named to the All-Tournament Team.

Most Valuable Player
Michael Busby was named Tournament Most Valuable Player.  Busby was a pitcher for UAB.

References

Tournament
Conference USA Baseball Tournament
Conference USA baseball tournament
Conference USA baseball tournament
Baseball in Mississippi
College sports in Mississippi
History of Rankin County, Mississippi
Sports competitions in Mississippi
Tourist attractions in Rankin County, Mississippi